The Depression and Bipolar Support Alliance (DBSA), formerly the National Depressive and Manic Depressive Association (NDMDA), is a nonprofit organization providing support groups for people who live with depression or bipolar disorder as well as their friends and family. DBSA's scope also includes outreach, education and advocacy regarding depression and bipolar disorder. DBSA employs a small staff and operates with the guidance of a Scientific Advisory Board.

DBSA sponsors online and "face to face" support groups. A nonrandomized study found participants in such groups reported their coping skills, medication compliance, and acceptance of their illness correlated with participation. Member hospitalization decreased by 49% (from 82% to 33%). Following an initial meeting, members were found to be 6.8 times more likely to attend subsequent meetings if accompanied by a member the first time.

DBSA is a not-for-profit 501(c)(3) organization and receives over 21 million hits per year on their combined websites. Each month, DBSA distributes nearly 20,000 educational materials free of charge to anyone requesting information about mood disorders. DBSA reaches nearly five million people through their educational materials and programs, exhibit materials, and media activities.

See also
 Depression and Bipolar Support Alliance (Greater Houston)

References

External links
DBSA
DBSA Peer-to-Peer Resource Center
Technical Assistance Center (TAC) DBSA

Mental health organizations in Illinois
Support groups
Bipolar disorder
Medical and health professional associations in Chicago